Target hardening, also referred to simply as hardening when made clear by the context,  is a term used by police officers, those working in security, and the military referring to the strengthening of the security of a building or installation in order to protect it in the event of attack or reduce the risk of theft.  It is believed that a "strong, visible defense will deter or delay an attack".

In terms of business and home security, target hardening is one of the suite of protective measures that are included in crime prevention through environmental design.  This can include ensuring all doors and windows are sourced and fitted in such a way that they can resist forcible and surreptitious intruder attack, adding hard barriers and landscapes that resist vehicle and pedestrian intrusion, adding fences, walls and hostile planting. All of these are greatly assisted by removing or pruning any trees or bushes that could offer suitable hiding places or could be used to climb to a higher level of the property.  However, for a business, taking target hardening too far can send the wrong message out to potential customers.

In military or counter-terrorism terms, target hardening refers to ensuring strategic or tactical assets are secured against adversary attack.

Other more specific terms associated with target hardening include hostile vehicle mitigation and "blast hardening".

See also
Armour#Other types
Counter-terrorism
Radiation hardening
Aviation Security in Airport Development - A UK Department of Transport airport anti-terror target-hardening program.

References

Further reading
Target Hardening at a New York City Subway 
Target Hardening the City of Orlando 
The Target Hardening Trap

Targeting (warfare)